Lophocochlias is a genus of minute sea snails or micromolluscs, marine gastropod molluscs in the family Tornidae.

Species
Species within the genus Lophocochlias include:
 † Lophocochlias oblongus Lozouet, 2011 
 Lophocochlias parvissimus (Hedley, 1899)
 † Lophocochlias paucicarinatus Ladd, 1966 †
 Lophocochlias procerus Rubio & Rolán, 2015
 † Lophocochlias stampinensis Lozouet, 2011 †
Species brought into synonymy
 Lophocochlias escondidus Poppe, Tagaro & Goto, 2018: synonym of Crosseola escondida (Poppe, Tagaro & Goto, 2018) (original combination)
 Lophocochlias minutissimus (Pilsbry, 1921): synonym of Lophocochlias parvissimus (Hedley, 1899)

References

 Lozouet (P.), 2011 Nouvelles espèces de gastéropodes (Mollusca: Gastropoda) de l’Oligocène et du Miocène inférieur d’Aquitaine (Sud-Ouest de la France). Partie 4. Cossmanniana, t. 13, p. 49-58 (

External links
  Pilsbry H.A. 1921. Marine mollusks of Hawaii, XIV-XV. Proceedings of the Academy of Natural Sciences, 72: 360-383
 Rubio F. & Rolán E. (2015). The genus Lophocochlias Pilsbry, 1921 (Gastropoda, Tornidae) in the Indo-West Pacific. Novapex. 16(4): 105-120

 
Tornidae